The women's artistic individual all-around competition at the 2006 Asian Games in Doha, Qatar was held on 3 and 4 December 2006 at the Aspire Hall 2.

Schedule
All times are Arabia Standard Time (UTC+03:00)

Results 
Legend
DNS — Did not start

Qualification

 Cha Yong-hwa of North Korea originally finished 34th, but the International Gymnastics Federation took disciplinary action after discovering that Cha's passport had been modified and her age falsified. Her individual results since August 2006 have been nullified.

Final

References

Results
Results

External links
Official website

Artistic Women Individual